Kopalino  is a village in the administrative district of Gmina Choczewo, within Wejherowo County, Pomeranian Voivodeship, in northern Poland. It is located within the ethnocultural region of Kashubia in the historic region of Pomerania.

The village has a population of 154, but this increases in the summer due to the large number of holiday homes in the village.

On December 22, 2021, Polskie Elektrownie Jądrowe announced the preferred location for Poland's first commercial nuclear power plant at a site called Lubiatowo-Kopalino just west of the village.

Images of Kopalino

References

Kopalino
Populated coastal places in Poland
Seaside resorts in Poland